Muhammed Khudayr al-Dulaymi was an Iraqi captured by the United States, and held in extrajudicial detention.
Al Dulaymi is believed to have been a senior intelligence official during the Saddam Hussein administration.
In May 2009 it became public that Vice President Dick Cheney had pushed for Al Dulaymi to be subjected to waterboarding, in order to establish that Saddam had ties to international terrorists.

References

Living people
Year of birth missing (living people)